The Brown University Graduate School is the graduate school of Brown University in Providence, Rhode Island. The school offers 51 doctoral programs and 33 master's programs.

History

While originally established in 1850 under university president Francis Wayland, graduate study at Brown ceased after seven years of operation. In 1887, the Graduate School was re-established; the first master's degrees were awarded in 1888, and the first Ph.D's in 1889.

Academics

Departments and programs

 Africana Studies
 American Studies
 Anthropology
 Applied Mathematics
 Archaeology and the Ancient World
 Behavioral and Social Health Sciences
 Biology
 Biotechnology
 Biomedical Engineering
 Biostatistics
 Brain Science
 Brazilian Studies
 Chemistry
 Classics
 Clinical and Translational Research
 Cognitive Science
 Comparative Literature
 Computer Science
 Data Science
 Earth, Environmental and Planetary Sciences
 Ecology and Evolutionary Biology
 Economics

 Egyptology and Assyriology
 Engineering
 English
 Epidemiology
 French Studies
 German Studies
 Global Public Health
 Health Services Research
 Hispanic Studies
 History
 History of Art and Architecture
 Innovation Management and Entrepreneurship
 Italian Studies
 Linguistics
 Literary Arts
 Mathematics
 Medical Sciences
 Modern Culture and Media
 Molecular Biology, Cell Biology, and Biochemistry
 Molecular Pharmacology and Physiology
 Music and Multimedia Composition
 Musicicology and Ethnomusicology

 Neuroscience
 Pathobiology
 Philosophy
 Physics
 Political Science
 Portuguese and Brazilian Studies
 Portuguese-Bilingual or ESL Education and Cross-Cultural Studies
 Public Affairs
 Public Health
 Public Humanities
 Psychology
 Religious Studies
 Slavic Studies
 Sociology
 Social Analysis and Research
 Teacher Education
 Theatre Arts and Performance Studies
 Urban Education Policy
 Executive Master: Cybersecurity
 Executive Master: Healthcare Leadership
 Executive Master: IE Brown Executive MBA
 Executive Master: Science and Technology Leadership

References

External links
 

Brown University
Graduate schools in the United States
Educational institutions established in 1850